The 2000 United States Senate election in Rhode Island was held on November 7, 2000. Republican U.S. Senator John Chafee had announced in 1999 that he would not seek reelection, leading his son, Lincoln Chafee, to announce his own candidacy. The elder Chafee, however, died a few months later; his son was appointed to fill the remainder of the unexpired term. The younger Chafee, now the incumbent, sought a full term and won, defeating Democratic U.S. Representative Bob Weygand. , this was the last congressional election in Rhode Island to be won by a Republican.

Democratic primary

Candidates 
 Robert Weygand, U.S. Representative
 Richard A. Licht, former Lieutenant Governor of Rhode Island and nominee for the United States Senate in 1988

Results

Republican primary

Candidates 
 Lincoln Chafee, incumbent U.S. Senator

Results

General election

Candidates 
 Lincoln Chafee (R), incumbent U.S. Senator
 Kenneth Proulx (I)
 Robert Weygand (D), U.S. Representative
 Christopher Young (Re)

Debates
Complete video of debate, September 24, 2000

Results

See also 
 2000 United States Senate elections

References 

2000 Rhode Island elections
Rhode Island
2000
Lincoln Chafee